The  or Kin-SAM is a surface-to-air missile used by the Japan Ground Self-Defense Force. It is the vehicle-borne version of the Type 91 missile.

It is known in JSDF ranks as the Closed Arrow.

Description
It was first deployed in 1993, due to a need to replace L-90 35mm Anti-Aircraft Twin Cannons in JGSDF service. It is typically deployed on a modified launcher BXD10 Kōkidōsha (military version Toyota Mega Cruiser) with a total of eight missiles ready to fire.

Operation
The Type 93 is a vast improvement over the L-90 as it has the ability to track down and shoot down enemy aircraft due to infrared homing.

See also
 Type 91 surface-to-air missile

References

External links

 Official JGSDF Page

Weapons and ammunition introduced in 1993
Surface-to-air missiles of Japan